Marie Louise Angélique Aimée Caroillon des Tillières, (or Aimée d'Osmond) (28 September 1797 – 2 August 1853) was a wealthy French heiress who kept a salon during the July Monarchy.

Early years

Marie Louise Angélique Aimée Caroillon des Tillières was born in 1797, only daughter of the wealthy entrepreneur Claude Caroillon Destillières and his wife, Françoise Aimée Magallon d'Amirail. Her father was from a rich family, ennobled in 1786, who made his fortune during and after the revolution through real estate transactions.

Claude Caroillon-Destillières died in May 1814 and Aimée Carvillon Destillères inherited his immense fortune.  Since she was only seventeen, a minor, her family chose her maternal grandparents as guardians. This was the subject of lawsuits, not resolved until 22 November 1816. She sold the Château du Raincy to Napoleon, but kept the Château de Pontchartrain.  Although not beautiful, she was courted by many men for her wealth.

Personal life
On 25 November 1817, Aimée married Charles-Eustache-Gabriel, called Rainulphe d'Osmond, Count and later Marquis d'Osmond (1787–1862) and a Lieutenant-General of Cavalry. He was the brother of the diarist Adèle d'Osmond, Countess de Boigne. Together, they had two children:

 Marie Charlotte Eustachine Jeanne (1827–1899), who married Jacquelin de Maillé de La Tour-Landry, 3rd Duke of Maillé (1815–1874), a son of Blanche-Joséphine Le Bascle d'Argenteuil.
 Rainulphe Marie Eustache d'Osmond (1829–1891), who married Marie Joséphine Tardieu de Maleyssie. Their son, Eustache Conrad d'Osmond (1855–1904) died without marrying, so the descendants of the Duke of Maillé inherited the Caroillon Destillières fortune.

The Marquise d'Osmond was gentle, modest and beneficial. According to the gossip of the time she was whipped by her husband.

Salon
Under the July Monarchy, she kept a very brilliant salon. With the Duchess of Berry she helped launch the fashionable neo-gothic style. They decorated her Parisian hôtel at 8 Rue Basse du Rempart in neo-gothic style.  It was later destroyed and is known only by a watercolor by Ambroise Louis Garneray. She also ordered beautiful neo-gothic furniture from Jacob Desmalter.

References

Sources

 

1797 births
1862 deaths
French salon-holders